Strela or strila (- arrow) is a popular type of candy sold in the Commonwealth of Independent States (CIS), primarily in Ukraine. It gets its name from its distinctive foiled cone shape which resembles an arrowhead.

Form
Strela has a very distinctive shape, taste and structure. The base is a metal cone made from a round piece of foil, sprinkled with a thin layer of chocolate. The candy is filled with a brandy-flavoured cream filling (although some manufacturers use fruit flavourings), which is extremely soft at room temperature. The wide end is sealed with a thick piece of chocolate and the confection is decorated according to the manufacturer's taste.

The foil cone is the distinguishing feature of this type of candy. It allows for ease of manufacture and safe storage and transportation of an otherwise too-soft candy body. Before eating, the candy is chilled so that the thin chocolate layer does not melt and become sticky; 20 °C is sufficient, but some people prefer a temperature of around 0 so that the candy will slowly melt in the mouth. The candy is held by the thick cone cap (which is deliberately left outside the foil cone and thick enough to hold) and the foil is gently unrolled immediately before consumption.

Because of their delicious taste, exquisite look and quality, this type of candy has a steady consumer base in the CIS, but the relatively high price (~30 US cents per piece) and small amount of chocolate restricts it from more widespread popularity.

Manufacturers
Since the trademark belonged to the former USSR and the candy was produced in more than one factory, the name is permitted for use by any manufacturer as long as the product satisfies certain technical requirements. Nestle-owned Svitoch, which manufactures Strela in Ukraine, has re-branded the product as Stozhary ( - torches).

References

Candy
Soviet brands
Ukrainian cuisine
Soviet cuisine